Dani Levy (born 17 November 1957) is a Swiss filmmaker, theatrical director, screenwriter and actor.

Biography
Levy was born to a Jewish family in Switzerland in 1957. His mother was a Holocaust survivor. He moved to Berlin in the 1980s.

Levy's films include RobbyKallePaul, I Was on Mars, Meschugge, Du mich auch and Väter. Väter starred Christiane Paul. In 2004, he directed Alles auf Zucker!, a comedy about a secularised Jew from the former GDR who has to reconcile himself with his Orthodox brother. In 2007, he directed the comedy drama Mein Führer – Die wirklich wahrste Wahrheit über Adolf Hitler, about a Jewish actor hired to enliven Adolf Hitler's speeches during the final days of World War II, starring Germans comedian Helge Schneider. It was entered into the 29th Moscow International Film Festival.

Levy said he was influenced by the theory of Swiss-based psychologist Alice Miller, published in 1980, that something must have gone wrong with Hitler in his childhood. His 1995 film Stille Nacht won an Honourable Mention at the 46th Berlin International Film Festival.

He is one of the founders of the German company X Filme Creative Pool.

Filmography
Director
1986: Du mich auch
1989: RobbyKallePaul
1991: I Was on Mars
1993: Ohne mich (Short)
1995: Stille Nacht
1998: Meschugge
1999: Das Geheimnis (Short)
2002: 
2004: Alles auf Zucker!
2007: Mein Führer – Die wirklich wahrste Wahrheit über Adolf Hitler
2010: 
2016: 
2019: Berlin, I Love You
2020. 

Actor
1986: Du mich auch .... Romeo
1989: RobbyKallePaul .... Robby
1991: Hausmänner .... Paul
1991: I Was on Mars .... Alio
1993: Ohne mich (Short) .... Simon Rosenthal
1994: Burning Life .... Neuss
1995: One of My Oldest Friends .... Zeto
1995: The Meds .... Jost
1995: Halbe Welt .... Katz
1996: Killer Condom .... Prostitute's Client
1996: Tempo (1996) .... Bernd
1998: Meschugge .... David Fish
1999: Aimée & Jaguar .... Fritz Borchert
1999: Die Hochzeitskuh .... Fleabag Hotel Concierge
2001: Replay .... Matthias
2004: Alles auf Zucker! .... Pool-Spieler (uncredited)
2009: Germany 09 .... Himself (segment "Joshua")
2010: 
2015: The People vs. Fritz Bauer .... Chaim Cohn
2015: Simon sagt 'Auf Wiedersehen' zu seiner Vorhaut .... Moderator
2018: Sohn meines Vaters .... Karl Kaufmann
2019: Winter Journey .... Landlord

References

External links
Wir sind X Filme

Theater Basel
Comedy on Hitler turns him into a clown

1957 births
Living people
German-language film directors
Actors from Basel-Stadt
Swiss male film actors
Swiss male television actors
20th-century Swiss male actors
21st-century Swiss male actors
Swiss film directors
Swiss Jews
Best Director German Film Award winners